Fon Tanasoontorn is a Thai Luk thung singer.

Early life
She was born in Udon Thani Province, on June 29, 1974.

She attended Pathum Thani University.

Career
She started on stage in 1988, winning the beauty pageant Miss. Teen Olie. She then made commercials, starting with Olie Candy and appeared on the cover of Preaw magazine.

She was a singer for Kliver Entertainment, making a pop studio album Mum Nueng Khong Huajai, released in 1995. Until 1997, she was a singer for record label Sure Entertainment. She adopted the Luk thung genre and later signed  with Music D. Entertainment.

Discography
 Hak Aai Jong Bong ฮักอ้ายโจงโปง (1998)
 Jai Oon ใจอ่อน (2000)
 Aeb Rak Khao แอบรักเขา ชุดพิเศษ (2001)
 Kho Chai Sit ขอใช้สิทธิ์ (2002)
 Phee Chai Chue Krao พี่ชายชั่วคราว (2003)
 Plae Pen Wan Valentine แผลเป็นวันวาเลนไทน์ (2004)
 Rak Mod Jai รักหมดใจ ชุดพิเศษ (2005)
 Dao Pradab Jai ดาวประดับใจ ชุดพิเศษ (2005)
 Koi Koi Ploi Mue ค่อยๆ ปล่อยมือ (2005)
 Fon Fak Rak ฝนฝากรัก (2006)
 Hua Jai Fak Tham หัวใจฝากถาม (2006)
 Tueng Vela Bok Rak ถึงเวลา...บอกรัก (2007)
 lieak Thee Rak Dai Mai เรียกที่รักได้มั้ย (2008)
 Pen Fan Kan Ma เป็นแฟนกันมะ (2008)
 Rak Nee Mai Mee Lueam รักนี้ไม่มีลืม (2009)
 Chan Ja Ngon Laew Na ฉันจะงอนแล้วนะ (2010)
 Kaew Ta Duang Jai แก้วตาดวงใจ (2011)

References

1974 births
Living people
Fon Tanasoontorn
Fon Tanasoontorn
Fon Tanasoontorn